Yves-Marie Le Gouaz, (15 February 1742, Brest – 12 June 1816, Paris) was a French engraver.

Life 
A student of Nicolas Ozanne (he married Ozanne's sister Marie-Jeanne Ozanne) and then of Jacques Aliamet, in 1770 he became engraver to the Académie des sciences, which put him in charge of creating many new works. Le Gouaz was a talented artist, and made 60 engravings of French ports based on drawings by Ozanne. He also produced the Pêche de jour, the Pêche de nuit, the Choix du poisson, the Embarquement de la jeune Grecque after Vernet; Fin d'orage, after Peters, etc.

References 
  Grand dictionnaire universel du XIXe by Pierre Larousse
  Une famille d'artistes brestois au XVIIIe siècle – Les Ozanne par le docteur Charles Auffret, Hyacinthe Caillière éditeur, Rennes, 1891.

1742 births
1816 deaths
18th-century engravers
19th-century engravers
French engravers
Artists from Brest, France
French male artists